Cora Faith Walker (née Drew; November 5, 1984 – March 11, 2022) was an American politician who served as a member of the Missouri House of Representatives for the 74th district from January 2017 to July 2019. On July 29, 2019, Walker resigned from the Missouri House of Representatives and became the policy director for St. Louis County executive Sam Page.

Walker earned a Bachelor of Arts from the Washington University in St. Louis, a Master of Public Health from Washington University's George Warren Brown School of Social Work and a Juris Doctor and health law certificate from the Saint Louis University School of Law.

Walker lived in Ferguson, Missouri. On March 11, 2022, Walker collapsed at a hotel in St. Louis, where she had attended a birthday party for Mayor Tishaura Jones. She was taken to a hospital, where she was pronounced dead, aged 37. The cause of death was determined to have been non-ischemic cardiomyopathy.

References

External links
 Campaign website
 
 
 

1984 births
2022 deaths
21st-century African-American politicians
21st-century American politicians
21st-century American women politicians
African-American state legislators in Missouri
African-American women in politics
Deaths from cardiomyopathy
Democratic Party members of the Missouri House of Representatives
George Warren Brown School of Social Work alumni
Politicians from St. Louis County, Missouri
Saint Louis University School of Law alumni
Washington University in St. Louis alumni
Women state legislators in Missouri